Choreography, released in 2006, is the third studio album by the American singer/songwriter Lauren Hoffman. For its production and recording, she worked with John Morand (who produced, mixed or played on Hoffman's releases throughout her career and ran Sound of Music Studios with Cracker's David Lowery), collaborator on 1997's Megiddo and 2010's Interplanetary Traveller.  Consistent with her previous work, the album conveys an overall dark, moody atmosphere, as a result of its lyrical qualities, production, and variety of instruments, including prominent accordion, pump organ, cello, and piano parts throughout its tracks.

Track listing

References

External links
Lauren Hoffman's official website
 Further information on Lauren Hoffman

2006 albums
Lauren Hoffman albums